Maite is a village in Ancuabe District of Cabo Delgado Province in northeastern Mozambique.

It is located east of Chiure and south of the district capital of Ancuabe.

References

External links 
Satellite map at Maplandia.com

Populated places in Ancuabe District